Victoria Azarenka was the defending champion, but chose not to participate this year.

Agnieszka Radwańska won the title, defeating Dominika Cibulková in the final, 6–0, 6–0. This was only the eighth WTA singles final to be won with a 6–0, 6–0 (a "double bagel") scoreline in history, and the first since Marion Bartoli won the 2006 Challenge Bell.

Seeds

Draw

Finals

Top half

Bottom half

Qualifying

Seeds

Qualifiers

Draw

First qualifier

Second qualifier

Third qualifier

Fourth qualifier

Fifth qualifier

Sixth qualifier

References

Main Draw
Qualifying Draw

W